Nik Dashev (born 13 October 1991 in Sofia) is a Bulgarian retired football player, who played as a goalkeeper for Chernomorets Burgas and Cherno More, before retiring at age of 23.

External links 
  chernomoretz.bg profile

1991 births
Living people
Bulgarian footballers
First Professional Football League (Bulgaria) players
PFC Chernomorets Burgas players
PFC Cherno More Varna players

Association football goalkeepers